77 Sunset Strip is a 1958-1964 American television private detective drama series created by Roy Huggins and starring Efrem Zimbalist Jr., Roger Smith, Richard Long (from 1960 to 1961) and Edd Byrnes (billed as Edward Byrnes). The character of detective Stuart Bailey, portrayed in the series by Zimbalist, was first used by writer Huggins in his 1946 novel The Double Take, later adapted  into the 1948 film I Love Trouble which was also written by Huggins.

Series overview

Episodes

Season 1: 1958–59

Season 2: 1959–60

Season 3: 1960–61

Season 4: 1961–62

Season 5: 1962–63

Season 6: 1963–64
This season was approached in a film noir style, and it was essentially a different show, with no connection to the original series. Season 6 featured a private investigator named Stuart Bailey who was still played by Efrem Zimbalist, but he had a different personality and background. Bailey's office was located in a different building than before, although the show name was still 77 Sunset Strip. The theme music was changed as well. The show was canceled midway through the 1963/64 season; summer repeats shown during the summer of 1964 were all from earlier seasons.

References

External links
 
 

77 Sunset Strip